Jianping High School is a high school based in Pudong New Area, Shanghai, China. Founded in 1944 by local intellectuals, the school was awarded "key high school" in Shanghai in 1978 by Shanghai Bureau of Education. The school was recognized as Famous Trademarks in Shanghai.

Jianping High School has partnerships with various high schools from United States, Japan, Germany, United Kingdom and Sweden. The school is currently a member of World Leading Schools Association.

References 

High schools in Shanghai
1944 establishments in China
Pudong